The 1982 UK & Ireland Greyhound Racing Year was the 56th year of greyhound racing in the United Kingdom and Ireland.

Roll of honour

Summary
The National Greyhound Racing Club (NGRC) released the annual returns, with totalisator turnover down 15%, at £63,233,040 and attendances down 10%, recorded at 4,311,554 from 5432 meetings. Attendances had decreased significantly for the third successive year to a new record low. Track tote retention increased slightly from 17% to 17.5%. One attempt to increase attendances was a 15% increase in advertised open races.

Lauries Panther, a black and white dog was voted Greyhound of the Year. He won the 1982 English Greyhound Derby at White City and the Laurels at Wimbledon Stadium.

Tracks
White City Stadium in Manchester closed, the track had been sold to developers by the Greyhound Racing Association (GRA) the previous year. The Cock o' the North and Manchester Cup both switched to Belle Vue Stadium. Ladbrokes closed Leeds on 15 March, they had also sold to developers the previous year, trainer Peter Beaumont joined Belle Vue.

News
Bob Rowe relinquished his position as White City Racing Manager to take up the role of Chief Racing Manager of the GRA, the previous year Hugh Richardson had vacated that job after retiring. John Collins was brought in to replace Bob Rowe at White City. Jim Woods formerly Charlie Boulton's assistant at Harringay Stadium took up the position of Racing Manager at Perry Barr.

Trainers Joe Pickering and Colin West retired leaving White City two trainers short, they appointed Graham Mann (son of Sid Mann) and Frank Melville from Harringay as replacements. Powderhall Stadium replaced Mann with their first ever female trainer Jane Glass.

Five rival totalisator companies featured at the W.G.R.F exhibition, they were - Data Tote systems, United totalisator company, Stadia systems, Control systems Ltd (Bell Punch) and Amtote from the United States.  World of Sport transmitted live races at the Ladbrokes Golden Jacket meeting at Harringay.

Competitions
Irish Grand National champion Face The Mutt, now with Norah McEllistrim won the Grand National to complete a double.

Lauries Panther won the Laurels before being retired to stud. A brindle dog called Yankee Express won the Scurry Gold Cup at Slough Stadium for trainer George Curtis and Special Account won the Scottish Greyhound Derby for the Savvas, breaking the track record twice in the process during the semis and final. Huberts Shade trained by Adam Jackson at Wembley sealed a classic double by winning the St Leger at his home track and the Grand Prix at Walthamstow Stadium.

Mount Vernon Sports Stadium near Glasgow offered a first prize of £6,000 for the Ashfield Derby, the same prize as the official Scottish Derby.

Ireland
After winning the Alpha Abrasive Puppy Stakes in Ireland a white and black greyhound called Game Ball was sold to English owners Brian Smith and Jerry Fisher for the large sum of £8,000.

Principal UK races

+Track Record

Totalisator returns

The totalisator returns declared to the National Greyhound Racing Club for the year 1982 are listed below.

References 

Greyhound racing in the United Kingdom
Greyhound racing in the Republic of Ireland
UK and Ireland Greyhound Racing Year
UK and Ireland Greyhound Racing Year
UK and Ireland Greyhound Racing Year
UK and Ireland Greyhound Racing Year